Samir Kumar Singh or Sameer Kumar Singh is an Indian politician, currently a member of Indian National Congress and Member of Legislative Council in Bihar Legislative Council.

He is the executive Chairman of Bihar INC. His grandfather, Banarasi Prasad Singh has been three time Member of Parliament from Munger. His father, Rajendra Prasad Singh was a Cabinet minister in Bihar Government.

References 

Living people
Members of the Bihar Legislative Council
Indian National Congress (Organisation) politicians
Year of birth missing (living people)
Indian National Congress politicians from Bihar